The Privilegium maius ( 'greater privilege') was a medieval document forged in 1358 or 1359 at the behest of Duke Rudolf IV of Austria (1358–65) of the House of Habsburg, claiming the family has the right to rule Rome because of land rights granted to them by Nero and Julius Caesar. It was essentially a modified version of the Privilegium minus issued by Emperor Frederick I Barbarossa in 1156, which had elevated the former March of Austria into a duchy. In a similar way, the Privilegium maius elevated the duchy into an Archduchy of Austria.

The privileges described in the document had great influence on the Austrian political landscape, and created a unique connection between the House of Habsburg and Austria.

Background
The House of Habsburg had gained rulership of the Duchy of Austria in 1282. Rudolph IV (1339–1365) attempted to restore the Habsburg influence on the European political scene by trying to build relations with Holy Roman Emperor Charles IV of Luxembourg and increasing the respect of the Austrian rulers. However, Rudolph IV did not belong to the seven Prince-electors, who—as dictated by the Golden Bull of 1356—had the power to choose the king. In the same way Charles IV had made Prague the center of his rule, Rudolph did the same for Vienna, giving it special privileges, launching construction projects and founding the University of Vienna. All this aimed at increasing the legitimacy and influence of the House and its Austrian lands. For this purpose, in the winter of 1358/1359, Rudolph IV ordered the creation of a forged document called Privilegium maius ("the greater privilege").

Document
The Privilegium maius consists of five forged deeds, some of which purported to have been issued by Julius Caesar and Nero to the historic Roman province of Noricum, which was roughly coterminous with the modern Austrian borders. Though purposefully modeled on the Privilegium minus, the original of which "got lost" at the same time, the bundle was already identified as a fake by contemporaries such as the Italian scholar Petrarch.

In the Privilegium maius, Rudolf IV declared Austria an "archduchy", endowed with rights similar to those of the prince-electors of the Holy Roman Empire such as:  

 inseparability of the territory
 automatic inheritance of the first-born (primogeniture), later extended to female heirs in the Pragmatic Sanction of 1713 in favour of Archduchess Maria Theresa
 independent jurisdiction and legislature, without any possibility to appeal to the Emperor (privilegium de non evocando)
 permission to display certain symbols of rule

Rudolf also created the title Pfalzerzherzog ("Archduke Palatine"), similar to the Elector Palatine of the Rhine, the holder of an electoral vote. The first Habsburg ruler who actually used the title of an archduke was Ernest of Iron, ruler of Inner Austria from 1406 to 1424. From the 15th century onward, all princes of the Habsburg dynasty were called Erzherzöge.

Effects
Emperor Charles IV refused to confirm the Privilegium maius, although he accepted some claims. The discoverer of the forgery was his advisor, the poet and scholar Petrarch. However, Frederick III, having become Holy Roman Emperor, was able to confirm the document and made it part of imperial law, thus making fiction become fact. From then on, the status as claimed by the document became widely accepted. Frederick also extended the Privilegium Maius by granting the power of ennoblement for his family as hereditary rulers of Austria (this power was normally reserved for the emperor). Thus, the act of confirmation by Frederick was what elevated the House of Habsburg to a special rank within the Empire.

The Privilegium maius had great influence on the Austrian political landscape. The Habsburg archduke arrogated an almost king-like position, and demonstrated this to outsiders through the usage of special insignia. The Habsburgs gained a new foundation for their rule in these lands; in a way, the House of Habsburg and Austria became a single unit. The family subsequently published special editions of the documents, and forbade all discussion of their authenticity.<ref name=heimann>Heinz-Dieter Heimann: Die Habsburger. Dynastie und Kaiserreiche. . pp.30-35</ref>

With the dissolution of the Holy Roman Empire in 1806, the Privilegium maius'' finally lost its meaning. In 1852, it was proven a forgery by historian Wilhelm Wattenbach.

Notes

References

External links
Privilegium maius at the Aeiou Encyclopedia

14th century in Austria
Document forgeries
Political forgery
Medieval documents
House of Habsburg